Lacrosse was a demonstration sport at the 1928 Summer Olympics in Amsterdam. Teams from Canada, Great Britain, and the United States played round-robin matches on August 5, 6 and 7. Each team ended the tournament with a record of 1 win and 1 loss.

The Johns Hopkins Blue Jays men's lacrosse team represented the United States. Canada and Great Britain sent their all-star teams.

Results 
August 5, 1928 - United States 6 - Canada 3
August 6, 1928 - Great Britain 7 - United States 6
August 7, 1928 - Canada 9 - Great Britain 5
Source:

Teams

Canada

Starters
J. Stoddart
L. Gregory
C. Grauer
R. A. Mackie
A. Farrow
W. Fraser
A. Brown
J. Vernon
N. Atkinson
J. Wood
C. Doyle
A. W. Wilkie

Reserves:
F. D. Bourne
D. Grauer
L. P. Gregory
E. G. Burnett
W. G. Hersperger

United States

Starters:
W. F. Logan
Th. N. Biddison
G. Helfrich
J. K. Eagan
L. S. Nixdorff
J. D. Lang
J. W. Boynton
Robert H. Roy
W. A. Kegan
R. M. Finn
C. Gardner Mallonee
C. Leibensperger

Reserves:
F. H. Dotterweich
L. H. Farinholt
W. P. Hall, Jr.
H. M. Caplan
C. C. Brownley

Great Britain

Starters:
P. L. V. Astle
L. Clayton
A. B. Craig
H. H. Crofts
S. M. Fleeson
G. F. Higson
F. E. Johnson
H. C. Johnson
O. J. Knudsen
E. Parsons
F. C. G. Perceval
A. J. Phillips

Reserves:
E. R. Richards
G. P. Seed
W. D. Stott
E. E. Tweedale
S. Wood
J. P. V. Woollam

Source:

See also
Federation of International Lacrosse
World Lacrosse Championship

References

External links
Photo of 1928 Olympic lacrosse game between U.S. and Canada

1928
1928 Summer Olympics events
Lacrosse in the Netherlands
1928 in lacrosse
Men's events at the 1928 Summer Olympics